These are the official results of the Women's 4 × 400 m Relay event at the 1988 Summer Olympics in Seoul, South Korea. There were a total number of sixteen nations competing.

Soviet Union had the gold and bronze medalists from the 400 metres race and the silver medalist from the 400 hurdles.  With the retirement of East German Marita Koch and Czech Jarmila Kratochvílová, gold medalist Olha Bryzhina had the fastest time of any active athlete when she finished a close second behind Koch's world record three years earlier, the #3 runner in history at the time.  Her 48.64 earlier in the week showed she hadn't lost a step.  The Soviet's fourth runner had a bronze medal from the 1983 world championships.

From the gun, hurdler Tatyana Ledovskaya looked to have a slight lead over former high school athlete Denean Howard.  Just as she had done in the hurdles, Ledovskaya tied up a bit on the final straight, Howard put the USA in first at the handoff with a 49.8 out of starting blocks.  Going through the third turn, it was already clear this was a two team race. Diane Dixon got to the break line first and took over the lead position over Olga Nazarova.  After making the pass, Nazarova opened up about a 10-meter lead on Dixon going into the handoff.  Mariya Pinigina took the handoff and extended the lead another five metres by the 200 mark against Valerie Brisco-Hooks.  But through the turn Brisco-Hooks started to make some headway.  On the final straight, Pinigina began to tie up.  The lead evaporated as Brisco-Hooks gained with every step.  At the handoff, it was barely a meter, with FloJo taking the baton and strategically staying behind Bryzhina.  Down the backstretch and through the final turn, Griffith-Joyner stayed the same distance behind Bryzhina as if there was a rope between the two.  At the end of the turn, Griffith-Joyner looked to gain a little but Bryzhina sensed the attack and accelerated away, widening the gap slightly.  In the final 50 metres, Griffith-Joyner made one more attack, but it wasn't with sprint speed.   She was able to close down the gap to 2 metres by the finish but it was a clear win for the Soviets in their final appearance in an Olympic relay.

As it turned out, both Nazarova and Bryzhina tied Taťána Kocembová for the third fastest relay splits in history to that point in time with 47.8.  Griffith-Joyner's 48.0 is next on that list.  Since then, only Allyson Felix has run faster.

The American time 3:15.51 was more than four tenths of a second faster than the four-year-old world record.  The winning Soviet time 3:15.17 improved the world record by three quarters of a second.  Since that day, more than a quarter of a century, those two times remain the fastest in history.  No team has come within a second and a half of the world record.  Only four squads, all American Olympic or world championship teams, have since beaten the East German time from a distant third place in this race.

Records
These were the standing World and Olympic records (in minutes) prior to the 1988 Summer Olympics.

The following World and Olympic record (in minutes) was set during this competition.

Final
Held on Saturday 1988-10-01

Semifinals
Held on Friday 1988-09-30

See also
 1986 Women's European Championships 4 × 400 m Relay (Stuttgart)
 1987 Women's World Championships 4 × 400 m Relay (Rome)
 1990 Women's European Championships 4 × 400 m Relay (Split)
 1991 Women's World Championships 4 × 400 m Relay (Tokyo)

References

External links
 Official Report
 Results

R
Relay foot races at the Olympics
1988 in women's athletics
Women's events at the 1988 Summer Olympics